Joseline Esteffanía Velásquez Morales is a Guatemalan activist and coordinator of several NGOs.

Velásquez is an activist for women's sexual and reproductive rights and feminists. She currently helps through NGOs Go Joven Guatemala, Girls Not Brides and Fondo CAMY to educate girls and young women in Guatemalan communities on issues of sexuality and prevention. She also fights to end forced marriages in Guatemala and unwanted pregnancies.

In 2018, Velásquez was listed as one of BBC's 100 Women.

References

Date of birth missing (living people)
Living people
Guatemalan women activists
21st-century Guatemalan women
BBC 100 Women
Year of birth missing (living people)